Gran Guerrero (born 1993) is a Mexican luchador enmascarado (or masked professional wrestler), who works for Consejo Mundial de Lucha Libre (CMLL). He portrays a rudo ("bad guy") wrestling character. He was originally introduced to the wrestling world under the ring name Último Guerrero Jr. in 2009 as the storyline son of Último Guerrero. He later made his wrestling debut under the name Taurus. In 2013 he was given a new image, re-introduced under the ring name "Gran Guerrero", officially acknowledging that he was the much younger brother of Último Guerrero. Gran Guerrero's real name is not a matter of public record, as is often the case with masked wrestlers in Mexico where their private lives are kept a secret from the wrestling fans.

He is a member of Los Guerreros Laguneros, a group of rudo wrestlers led by his brother which also includes Templario. Gran Guerrero's highest-profile match of his career, the main event of the CMLL 84th Anniversary Show, was a Lucha de Apuestas, "bet match", victory over Niebla Roja where he forced his opponent to unmask after his loss.

Professional wrestling career

Último Guerrero Jr. (2009)
In early 2009, professional wrestler Último Guerrero introduced "Último Guerrero Jr." to the public. He revealed that he was training for a professional wrestling career. At the time he was introduced as the son of Último Guerrero. It is not uncommon for masked wrestlers being presented as relatives to well-known wrestlers who are not blood relations, but merely paid for the rights to use the mask and name. In Último Guerrero Jr.'s case it was later confirmed that there was a blood relationship between the two, just not father and son.

Taurus (2011–2013)

When he finally made his in-ring debut, he adopted the name "Taurus" in order to gain experience as a wrestler without revealing his family relationship. Between 2010 and 2011 he only occasionally wrestled matches on various local independent promotion shows. In 2011 he began appearing at International Wrestling Revolution Group (IWRG) events, especially those featuring wrestlers attending the promotion's training school Futuro Idolos de Lucha Libre (FILL). He competed in the 13th, 14th, and 17th Torneo FILL, but did not win either of those tournaments. On July 23, 2011, he competed in IWRG's Copa Higher Power tournament but was defeated by Maquina Infernal. It was not until March 11, 2012, that Taurus  teamed up with his older brother Último Guerrero. The team-up indicated the family relationship as they competed in Toryumon Mexico as part of their Copa Toyota tournament, where a rookie and a veteran pair up. The brothers defeated El Hijo del Fantasma and Magnus in the first round but lost to the team of Último Dragón and Angélico in the finals.

Shortly after his DragonMania VII appearance Taurus was announced as part of Consejo Mundial de Lucha Libre's (CMLL) Generacion 2012, a group of young wrestlers who made their debut in 2012 and in addition to Taurus included Guerrero Negro Jr., Espanto Jr., Akuma, Herodes Jr., Oro Jr. and Génesis. Taurus made his CMLL in-ring debut on June 18, 2012, teaming with Bobby Zavala and Hooligan as the team lost to Leono, Metálico, and Sensei. Taurus was the last of the Generacion 2012 wrestlers to make his CMLL Super Viernes (CMLL's main show) debut, as he teamed with Zayco to lose to Leono and Metálico on the September 28, 2012 show. On October 14, 2012, worked a Toryumon benefit show for injured wrestler Electrico. On the show, the team of Taurus, El Hijo del Medico Asesino and El Hijo del Signo defeated Magnus, Mr. Rolling, and Platino.

In early 2013 Taurus teamed up with Zumba to compete in Toryumon's 16th 2Torneo Juvenil Copa Dragon ("Young Dragon Tournament"), defeating fellow Generacion 2012'ers Akuma and Guerrero Negro Jr. in the quarterfinals, but losing to Los Hermanos Celestick in the semi-finals. Less than two months later CMLL held their second annual Torneo Sangre Nueva ("The New Blood Tournament"), a tournament that focuses primarily on younger wrestlers or wrestlers who work in the promotion's lower ranks, generally the first or second match of the show, as a way to highlight or promote a wrestler up to a higher level of competition. Taurus was part of qualifying "Block B" of the tournament that competed on March 5, 2013, for the other finalist spot, with a field that also included Genesis, Oro Jr., Robin, Sensei, Super Halcón Jr., Disturbio, Guerrero Negro Jr., Inquisidor, and Zayco. Taurus won the torneo cibernetico elimination match, personally eliminating Sensei and Guerrero Negro Jr. to earn a spot in the finals the following week against Soberano Jr. Sobereano Jr. defeated Taurus, two falls to one to win the 2013 Sangre Nueva tournament.

In late March 2013 Taurus was announced as one of the Novatos, or rookies, in the 2013 Torneo Gran Alternativa, or "Great Alternative tournament". The Gran Alternativa pairs a rookie with an experienced wrestler for a tag team tournament. Taurus teamed up with veteran Averno and compete in Block A on April 12, 2013. The duo defeated Stigma and La Mascara in the first round but lost to Hombre Bala Jr. and Atlantis in the second round.

Gran Guerrero (2013–present)

During the celebration of Atlantis' 30th anniversary as a wrestler, Último Guerrero appeared after a match to berate him, as a part of the long-running storyline between the two. The appearance turned out to be a distraction, as a second Último Guerrero attacked Atlantis from behind. The two identically dressed Guerreros proceeded to beat up Atlantis and tear his mask apart. Following the match, Último Guerrero introduced his brother "Gran Guerrero" and made him a part of Los Guerreros del Infierno. On June 15, 2013, Gran Guerrero outlasted Aeroboy, Comando Negro, El Hijo del Signo, Epidemia, Fusion, Kato Kung Lee, Laberinto, Lucifer, Magnus, Relampago, Robin and Violento Jack to win the DragonMania VIII "Dragon Scramble" match. Gran Guerrero teamed up with Último Guerrero and Niebla Roja to defeat the then reigning CMLL World Trios Champions Los Estetas del Aire (Máscara Dorada, Místico and Valiente) in the semi-final match of the 2014 Homenaje a Dos Leyendas show.

In January 2015, Guerrero made his Japanese debut, when he took part in the Fantastica Mania 2015 tour, co-produced by CMLL and New Japan Pro-Wrestling. During the tour on January 18, Guerrero unsuccessfully challenged Volador Jr. for the NWA World Historic Welterweight Championship.

In March 2017, CMLL began a storyline where Niebla Roja started having problems with his fellow Los Guerreros Laguneros teammates, initially by accidentally causing them to lose matches due to a miscommunication between Niebla Roja, Euforia, and Gran Guerrero. On May 19 Niebla Roja's tecnico turn was completed as he kicked Los Guerreros leader Último Guerrero in the face during a match. Afterward, Último Guerrero and Gran Guerrero beat Niebla Roja up, tore his mask off and demanded that Niebla Roja to come up with a new mask instead of wearing the Último Guerrero inspired mask. During the attack, Niebla Roja was aided by his brother Ángel de Oro. The long-running storyline rivalry between Gran Guerrero and Niebla Roja led to the main event of CMLL's 84th Anniversary Show on September 16, 2017. Both wrestlers put their masks on the line in a Lucha de Apuestas match, and as a result of his loss, Niebla Roja was forced to unmask afterward.

The Guerrero brothers participated in the "Brothers tag team tournament", held as part of the Fantastica Mania 2018 tour of Japan. On January 21 they defeated Gran Guerrero's rival Niebla Roja and Ángel de Oro in the first round, followed by beating Dragon Lee and Místico in the next day's finals. On July 1, 2018, Los Guerreros Lagunero ended Sky Team's 1,223-day reign with the CMLL World Trios Championship as they defeated them in the main event of CMLL's Domingos Arena México show. Subsequently, Los Guerreros were positioned as "Defenders of CMLL" as they began a storyline feud with "The Cl4n" (Ciber the Main Man, The Chris, and Sharlie Rockstar), three wrestlers who had made a name for themselves in CMLL's main rival Lucha Libre AAA Worldwide. On September 14, The Cl4n won the trios championship, followed by Los Guerreros regaining the championship two weeks later on September 28. 2018. On March 26, 2021, they lost the Trios Championship against Nueva Generación Dinamita.

Personal life
Gran Guerrero was born in 1993 in Gómez Palacio, Durango, Mexico. His real name is not a matter of public record, as is often the case with masked wrestlers in Mexico who have not been unmasked. It is traditional for an enmascarado to conceal their private lives from wrestling fans, supported by the media generally not reporting on masked wrestlers birth names. He was originally presented as the son of José Gutiérrez Hernández (Último Guerrero) in 2009, but it was later confirmed that he was, actually, the 20-year younger brother of Gutiérrez.

Championships and accomplishments 

 Consejo Mundial de Lucha Libre
CMLL World Heavyweight Championship (1 time, current)
CMLL World Tag Team Championship (1 time)  – with Euforia
 CMLL World Trios Championship (2 times) – with Euforia and Último Guerrero
Federación Mundial de Lucha Libre
FMLL Tag Team Championship (1 time) – with Último Guerrero
 New Japan Pro-Wrestling
 CMLL's Brother Tag Team Tournament (2018) – with Último Guerrero
Pro Wrestling Illustrated
 Ranked No. 173 of the top 500 singles wrestlers in the PWI 500 in 2021

Lucha de Apuestas record

References

1993 births
Living people
Masked wrestlers
Mexican male professional wrestlers
Professional wrestlers from Durango
People from Gómez Palacio, Durango
Unidentified wrestlers
CMLL World Tag Team Champions
CMLL World Trios Champions